The discography of American rapper and singer Chance the Rapper consists of one studio album, five mixtapes and 27 singles (including 14 singles as a featured artist).

Chance the Rapper released his debut mixtape, 10 Day on April 3, 2012. The mixtape was followed up by Acid Rap, which was released a year later to universal acclaim from music critics. Chance the Rapper went on to release his third mixtape Coloring Book on May 13, 2016. The mixtape peaked at number eight on the Billboard 200 chart and was supported by the singles, "Angels" and "No Problem", the latter single peaked at number 43 on the US Billboard Hot 100 chart. On July 16, 2019, Chance announced his debut album The Big Day, which was released on July 26.

Albums

Studio albums

Mixtapes

Singles

As lead artist

As featured artist

Promotional singles

Other charted songs

Guest appearances

Songwriting credits

Notes

References

External links
 
 

Discography
Discographies of American artists
Hip hop discographies